A Night with is a British entertainment show on ITV featuring well-known musicians. The first episode featured Will Young and was presented by Kate Thornton, the show aired on 27 August at 9pm. The second episode starred Beyoncé and was presented by Steve Jones, airing on 4 December at 9pm.

Episodes

2010 British television series debuts
ITV (TV network) original programming